The 1994 World Mountain Running Championships was the 10th edition of the global mountain running competition, World Mountain Running Championships. This annual event is organised by the World Mountain Running Association and was held in Berchtesgaden, Germany on September 4, 1994.

Results

Men
Distance 13.1 km, difference in height 1200 m (climb).

Men team

Men junior

Men junior team

Women

Women team

References

External links
 World Mountain Running Association official web site

World Mountain Running Championships
World Long Distance Mountain Running